In North American railroad terminology, a cab unit is a railroad "locomotive" with its own cab and controls.

"Carbody unit" is a related term, which  may be either a cabless booster unit controlled from a linked cab unit, or a cab unit that contains its own controls.

Characteristics
With both body styles, a bridge-truss design framework is used to make the body a structural element of the locomotive. The body extends the full width and length of the locomotive. The service walkways are inside the body.

Carbody units, gaining rigidity from the body trusswork, require less structural weight to achieve rigidity than do locomotives with non-structural bodies.  For that reason, carbody construction was favored to increase the power-to-weight ratio for early diesel locomotives, before the power available with diesel technology was increased. Recent years have seen carbody construction revived in the quest for greater fuel efficiency with passenger locomotives.

The full-width body gives a carbody cab unit poor rear visibility compared with a hood unit.  For that reason, cab or carbody units are mostly used in situations where rear visibility is not important, such as power for through freight and passenger trains.  Cab and carbody units are also more aerodynamic than hood units, and pulled many of the streamliner trains.

A and B unit
A cab unit is a carbody unit with a driving cab (or crew compartment).  Thus, a cab unit is also always an A unit (a locomotive with a cab). By contrast, a carbody unit can be either an A unit, or a B unit (a locomotive without a cab).

Passenger-oriented cab units
 EMC TA
 EMC EA/EB
 EMC E1
 EMC E2
 EMC E3
 EMC E4
 EMD E5
 EMD E6
 EMD E7
 EMD E8
 EMD E9
 EMD FP7
 EMD FP9
 EMD FL9
 EMC AA
 EMC AB6
 ALCO DL-103b
 ALCO DL-105
 ALCO DL-107
 ALCO DL-108
 ALCO DL-109
 ALCO DL-110
 ALCO DL-202
 ALCO DL-203
 ALCO FPA/FPB-1
 ALCO FPA/FPB-2
 ALCO PA/PB-1
 ALCO PA/PB-2
 Baldwin 4-8+8-4-750/8-DE
 Baldwin DR-12-8-1500/2 ¨Centipede¨
 Baldwin DR-6-4-2000
 Baldwin DR-6-4-1500
 Baldwin DR-6-2-1000
 Baldwin DR-4-4-15
 Baldwin RF-16
 Baldwin RP-210
 Fairbanks-Morse Erie-Built
 Fairbanks-Morse CPA-20-5
 Fairbanks-Morse CPA-24-5

Freight-oriented cab units 
 EMD FT
 EMD F2
 EMD F3
 EMD F7
 EMD F9
 ALCO FA/FB-1
 ALCO FA/FB-2
 Fairbanks-Morse CFA/B-16-4
 Fairbanks-Morse CFA/B-20-4
 Ingalls 4-S

Cowl unit
A cowl unit is an adaptation of the hood unit design with a full-width body. Despite some visual similarities, cowl units are actually very different from cab units.  All structural support on a cowl unit is provided by the frame of the locomotive, rather than in the body as with a cab unit. This allows manufacturers to cheaply and easily create full-width locomotives from their hood unit designs by simply adding cowling.  Cowl units were first introduced as a special order from the Santa Fe, which wanted a sleeker design for its passenger equipped hood units. Although the first cowl units (such as the EMD FP45 and the GE U30CG) were meant for passenger service, EMD would later offer freight-only derivatives starting with the F45.

Great Britain
Cab units were not generally used in Great Britain. The traditional makers continued to use heavyweight frames and cowl units instead.

The LMS twins 10000 and 10001 used the design and later locomotive types such as the British Rail Class 37, and British Rail Class 40 utilised cab units but the term "cab unit" is not used in Britain.  The Class 37 and Class 40, like most British diesel and electric locomotives, has a cab at each end.

As locomotives with a cab at each end do not have a "front" and "rear" end, the British convention is to refer to "no.1 end" or "no.2 end".  No.1 end is always the end of the locomotive containing the cooler group and is usually identifiable from the exterior by large cooling grilles for the radiators.

References

Diesel locomotives